Touffreville-sur-Eu is a commune in the Seine-Maritime department in the Normandy region in northern France.

Geography

Population

Places of interest
 The church of St. Sulpice, dating from the thirteenth century.
 A 20-metre high railway viaduct spans the river.

See also
Communes of the Seine-Maritime department

References

Communes of Seine-Maritime